Veeravasaram  is a village in West Godavari district of the Indian state of Andhra Pradesh.

Demographics
According to Indian census, 2001, the demographic details of Veeravasaram mandal is as follows:
 Total Population: 	64,142	in 16,237 Households
 Male Population: 	32,302	and Female Population: 	31,840		
 Children Under 6-years of age: 7,602	(Boys -	3,858 and Girls – 3,744)
 Total Literates: 	46,673

References

Villages in West Godavari district